Fucking A is a play written by American playwright Suzan-Lori Parks. It was produced and premiered by DiverseWorks and Infernal Bridegroom Productions in Houston, Texas on February 24, 2000.

Background

Fucking A is inspired by the novel The Scarlet Letter, written by Nathaniel Hawthorne in 1850. Both of the main characters are named Hester and are mothers with an unwavering love for their illegitimate child. Both Hesters also bear the letter “A” as a symbol of how society defines them: Parks' Hester is an abortionist, Hawthorne's is branded for adultery.

The idea for the play came to Parks while she was canoeing with a friend, when Parks yelled out, "I'm going to write a play, a riff on The Scarlet Letter, and I'm going to call it 'Fucking A'. Ha, ha, ha!" While Parks was initially joking, she couldn't get the idea out of her mind. She began working on the play, but after 4 years of drafts and rewrites she still hadn't come up with a workable plot.  She threw out everything except the title and the name Hester, and considered throwing out the latter as well, but the voice of Hester filled her mind and persuaded her to retain it and write Hester's story.

In the Blood
Before she wrote Fucking A, Parks wrote In the Blood. It is a contemporized version of Puritan adultery and guilt. The story revolves around Hester La Negrita and her struggle to survive in a world filled with sexual oppression along with her five children, all by different fathers. Once it was finished, she then went back to Fucking A, which she refers to as a "revenge tragedy" about abortionist Hester Smith.

Plot synopsis

Hester Smith is an abortionist, physically branded with the letter “A”.  Hester speaks to her friend Canary Mary about her son Boy, whom she has not seen for 20 years, since he was imprisoned as a child for stealing a piece of meat from a wealthy family.  The rich girl who denounced him has grown up to marry the vicious Mayor, and is now the First Lady.  Hester writes to her son, and is saving up to pay for an outing with him.  Canary confides to Hester that the Mayor has been cheating on his wife with her, and he is preparing to leave the First Lady because she cannot bear a child. Canary later walks through a park where she meets an escaped convict, Monster, and notices he has a scar on his arm.

In a bar, three hunters are bragging to each other about which one will catch Monster for the bounty.  Hester arrives at the bar to find Scribe, so he can write a letter to her son. While there she meets a man named Butcher who takes a liking to her.  Monster meets the First Lady in the park, they exchange some kind words and they kiss.

The next day Hester arrives home to find Monster has broken into her home and has set fire to her house.  He robs her of some of her money, but in seeing her scar, which matches his, he runs off.  The next day, Hester finally has enough for her to pay for a furloughed picnic with her son.  As she lays out the picnic spread, the guard brings out a prisoner called Jailbait, who Hester assumes is her son.  She embraces him and tries to get him to show her the scar she gave him on his arm when he was taken to prison, which matches hers, but he is more interested in the food than her.  Hester realizes Jailbait is not her son, at which point Jailbait claims that he killed her son in prison.  Hester is frozen with shock, and as Jailbait finishes eating and begins to rape her, she is still too stunned to resist.

The First Lady discovers she is pregnant and considers aborting the child since Monster may be the father. However, she decides to pass the baby as the Mayor's instead. Hester is now bent on revenge against the First Lady for putting her son in prison, and devises a plan with Canary to kill the First Lady, utilizing Butcher's unwitting help. When Hester learns that the First Lady is pregnant decides to abort the baby instead of killing her. Canary and Butcher bring a drugged First Lady to Hester's house, where Hester performs an abortion on her, not knowing that it is her own grandchild.  After Butcher and Canary leave, Monster, being chased by the Hunters, runs into the house.  Hester accepts that Monster is actually her son.  Monster tells Hester that if he is caught the hunters will torture him to death and begs her to kill him.  She slits his throat like a pig, which Butcher has told her is the least painful way. The Hunters enter and see that he is already dead and drag his body away to mutilate it. Hester stands alone in her house for an instant, but soon gets her abortion tools and goes into the other room to continue her work.

Characters
 Hester Smith: The abortion provider and main character. Her son has been sent to jail by the First lady.
 Canary Mary: A friend of Hester's and a "kept woman", a sex-worker.
 The Mayor:  Leader of a small piece of land.  Cheats on his wife with Canary Mary.
 The First Lady: The Mayor's wife. She is unable to bear children which really bothers the Mayor.  She sent Hester's son to jail.
 Butcher: A local Butcher who falls in love with Hester.
 Monster:  Escaped convict turns out to be Hester's son. Real name is Boy Smith.
 Freedom Fund Lady:  Collects money from Hester for the picnic bail.
 Scribe:  He writes beautifully, and Hester goes to him so he can write a letter to her son for her.
 First, Second, and Third Hunter: All three them are bent on catching Monster for a money prize and also so they can torture him.
 Jailbait:  He is mistaken for Hester's son and he's the one who actually has the dream picnics with Hester.
 Guard:  Brings Jailbait to Hester.
 Waiting Woman #1 and #2: Two women waiting to abort their child.
 3 Freshly Freed Prisoners: They sing a song during the play.

Language

Suzan-Lori Parks created a separate type of language called "Talk". It is used only by the women in the play.  The women who speak in "Talk" also speak English, but use "Talk" when they are talking about pregnancy or vaginas.

Here is an example of "Talk":

Canary: Die la-sah Chung-chung? Sah Chung-chung lay schreck, lay frokum, lay woah woah crisp woah-ya.

Translation: And her pussy? Her pussy is so disgusting, so slack so very completely dried out.

Hester: Rich Girl she tum woah Chun-chung crisp woah-ya, Rich Girl!

Translation: Rich girl yr pussy is all dried out, Rich Girl!

When "Talk" is used there is a projector of some sort that shows the translation onto the stage.

Music

Suzan-Lori Parks wrote numerous songs for this play.  Just about every character has a song that expresses something about themselves.  Hester has a song called “My Vengeance” and even the Hunters have a song called “The Hunters Creed”.  These songs are often sung during a scene where the character will break off and sing.

Here is one of the songs from the play:

Monster: "The Making of a Monster"

 "Youd think it'd be hard
 To make something horrid
 Its easy.

 Youd think it would take
 So much work to create
 The Devil Incarnate
 Its easy.

 The smallest seed grows to a tree
 A grain of sand pearls in an oyster
 A small bit of hate in a heart will inflate
 And that’s more so much more than enough
 To make you a Monster.

 Youd think itd be hard
 To make something horrid
 Its easy."

Productions
Premiere

Fucking A was originally produced by DiverseWorks for Infernal Bridgegroom Productions on February 24, 2000, in Houston, Texas. It was directed by Suzan-Lori Parks. The cast consisted of Tamarie Cooper, Amy Bruce, Charlie Scott, Amy Dickson, Andy Nelson, Troy Schulze, Lisa Marie Singerman, Cary Winscott, Keith Reynolds, Alexander Marchand, and Daniel Treadway.

Off-Broadway

It was presented Off-Broadway at the Public Theatre, opening on February 25, 2003.  Directed by Michael Greif, the cast consisted of Susan Blommaert, Bobby Cannavale, Mos Def, Peter Gerety, Jojo Gonzalez, Jesse Lenat, S. Epatha Merkerson, Manu Narayan, Chandler Parker, Daphne Rubin-Vega and Michole Briana White.

Off-Broadway

It was presented Off-Broadway at the Pershing Square Signature Center's Romulus Linney Courtyard Theatre, opening on August 22, 2017, in conjunction with Parks' play, In the Blood. These plays were presented as part of Residency One, a year-long artist residency at Signature Theatre.  Directed by Jo Bonney, the cast consisted of J. Cameron Barnett, Brandon Victor Dixon, Ben Horner, Joaquina Kalukango, Marc Kudisch, Christine Lahti, Ruibo Qian, Elizabeth Stanley, and Raphael Nash Thompson.

References

Plays by Suzan-Lori Parks
2000 plays